Opus tessellatum is the Latin name for the normal technique of Greek and Roman mosaic, made from tesserae that are larger than about 4 mm.  It is distinguished from the finer opus vermiculatum which used tiny tesserae, typically cubes of 4 millimetres or less, and was produced in workshops in relatively small panels which were transported to the site glued to some temporary support. Opus tessellatum was used for larger areas and laid down at the final site. The two techniques were often combined, with small panels of opus vermiculatum  called emblemata at the centre of a larger design in opus tessellatum.  The tiny tesserae of opus vermiculatum allowed very fine detail, and an approach to the illusionism of painting.  There was a distinct native Italian style of opus tessellatum using only black on a white background, which was no doubt cheaper than fully coloured work.

Opus tessellatum is usually used for backgrounds consisting of horizontally or vertically arranged lines, but not both in a grid, which would be opus regulatum.

See also
 Mosaic
 Mosaics of Delos
 Opus regulatum
 Opus sectile
 Opus vermiculatum

Notes

References

 

Mosaic
Italian mosaic
Roman mosaics